Italy has competed at every edition of the World Athletics Race Walking Team Championships (IAAF World Race Walking Cup until 2016, than IAAF World Race Walking Team Championships until 2018) form Lugano 1961.

Medals

Update to 2018 Taicang

Medals details

Men

Individual

Team
Until 1985, the first 4 classifieds of each nation were ranked for team ranking since 1987. In any case, the medals were awarded to the participants, although they did not finish the race.

Women

Individual

Team

Multiple medalists

Men

Women

See also 
 Italy national athletics team
 Italian team at the running events
 Italy at the European Race Walking Team Championships

References

External links 
 IAAF WORLD RACE WALKING CUP at gbratghletics.com(from 1961 to 2006)
 IAAF WORLD RACE WALKING TEAM CHAMPIONSHIPS - FACTS & FIGURES
 Italy at Race Waliking World Cup 

World Race Waliking Cup